The Governors Island Summit was a summit meeting between U.S. President Ronald Reagan and General Secretary of the Communist Party of the Soviet Union Mikhail Gorbachev. It was held on December 7, 1988. U.S. Vice President and President-elect George H. W. Bush was also in attendance.

See also 
List of Soviet Union–United States summits (1943 to 1991)

References

1988 conferences
1988 in international relations
1988 in New York City
1980s in Manhattan
December 1988 events in the United States
Cold War
Summit
Soviet Union–United States diplomatic conferences
20th-century diplomatic conferences
Presidency of Ronald Reagan
Mikhail Gorbachev